This is a list of AMA Superbike Championship and MotoAmerica circuits that have hosted a race from  through 2022.

External links
2009 event schedule
AMA Superbike Championship history until 2005

Circuits
AMA Superbike Championship